Stigmatomyces is a genus of fungi in the family Laboulbeniaceae. The genus contain 135 species.

References

External links
Stigmatomyces at Index Fungorum

Laboulbeniaceae
Laboulbeniales genera